Alissa Marie Chavez is an American inventor and entrepreneur. She is known for her invention "Hot Seat", an alarm for child car seats being left occupied, which she invented as a teenager. She is the founder and CEO of the company Assila.

Early life

Chavez was born in 1997 and raised in Albuquerque, New Mexico, by her single mother, a childcare owner.

Invention

At age 14, Chavez conceived the Hot Seat alarm as a science fair project, after hearing that many babies died from being left in cars. She later refined the idea and patented it, helping people with newborn care.

In 2019 she announced a new invention, a baby bottle that stores water and dried formula separately, for mixing when needed.

References

Living people
Year of birth missing (living people)
21st-century American inventors
Women inventors
People from Albuquerque, New Mexico